Sir John Henry Scourfield, 1st Baronet  (30 January 1808 – 3 June 1876) was a Welsh Conservative politician who sat in the House of Commons from 1852 to 1876.

Life
Scourfield was born John Henry Phillips, the son of Owen Phillips of Williamstown, Pembrokeshire, Wales and his wife Ann Elizabeth Scourfield, niece of William Henry Scourfield of the Mote and Robeston Hall. He was educated at Harrow School and at Oriel College, Oxford graduating BA 3rd class in classics in 1828 and MA in 1832.

He was a Deputy Lieutenant and J.P. for  Pembroke and chairman of the Quarter Sessions of Pembroke. He was also High Sheriff of Pembrokeshire in 1833 and Lord-Lieutenant and Custos Rotulorum of the borough of Haverfordwest. In 1862 he assumed the name of Scourfield by Royal Licence on succeeding to the estates of his maternal uncle.

Political career
At the 1852 general election Scourfield was elected Member of Parliament for Haverfordwest and held the seat until 1868. In 1857 he narrowly held on to the seat by two votes over the Liberal candidate William Rees, in a contest characterised by accusations of intimidation.

At the 1868 general election he was elected MP for Pembrokeshire and held the seat until his death aged 68 in 1876.  He was created a baronet by Disraeli on 18 February 1876 but died the following May.

He was against the Women's Disabilities Removal Bill, an early women's suffrage bill. He argued, in May 1872, that the novelist Jane Austen would be, too, were she alive. Scourfield argued this by using a quotation from Austen's novel Emma (1816), which was itself a quotation from Oliver Goldsmith, taken out of context. This appears to be the first time that Austen's name was referenced in official business in parliament.

Cricket
As John Philipps, he was a cricketer with amateur status who was associated with Marylebone Cricket Club (MCC) and made his first-class debut in 1830.

Works
He was the author of a number of published plays and poems.

Family
Scourfield married in 1845 Augusta Phillips, daughter of John Lort Phillips of Haverfordwest and Llawrenny Park, Pembrokeshire. They had two sons, the eldest of which, Owen, succeeded to the baronetcy (which became extinct on his death).

Notes

1808 births
1876 deaths
People educated at Harrow School
Alumni of Oriel College, Oxford
Deputy Lieutenants of Pembrokeshire
Lord-Lieutenants of Haverfordwest
Baronets in the Baronetage of the United Kingdom
UK MPs 1852–1857
UK MPs 1857–1859
UK MPs 1859–1865
UK MPs 1865–1868
UK MPs 1868–1874
UK MPs 1874–1880
High Sheriffs of Pembrokeshire
English cricketers
English cricketers of 1826 to 1863
Marylebone Cricket Club cricketers
Presidents of the Marylebone Cricket Club
Conservative Party (UK) MPs for Welsh constituencies
A to K v L to Z cricketers